Hans Rosenfeldt (born Hans Petersson on 13 July 1964) is a Swedish screenwriter, radio presenter, novelist and actor. He co-created the Swedish series De drabbade (2003) and Oskyldigt dömd (2008–09), and created the Scandinavian series The Bridge (2011–2018) and the ITV/Netflix series Marcella (2016–).

Early life 
Hans Petersson was born in 1964 in Borås, Västergötland. He grew particularly tall during puberty and was treated with growth hormone at fourteen years old to limit his growth. He considered a career as a basketball player, and briefly worked as a sea lion trainer at Borås djurpark. He also had jobs as a chauffeur and a teacher before deciding to become an actor. He took on the surname Rosenfeldt – his mother's maiden name – during school, replacing his birth name.

Career 
Rosenfeldt began acting in the late 1980s. In addition to small television roles, he acted with the Gothenburg National Theatre for five years, eventually realizing that he did not enjoy acting. Instead, he applied for a job at the radio program Glädjetåget and soon began writing for television, including the soap operas Rederiet and Tre kronor, in the 1990s.

As a radio personality, he has been a recurring panel member on Sveriges Radio P1's På Minuten for over a decade. He has also worked as a television presenter, hosting the game show Parlamentet from 2000 to 2003. In 2007, he co-wrote Sveriges Television's Christmas calendar, En riktig jul. He served briefly as an entertainment management at Sveriges Television, but did not feel suited to the role. Rosenfeldt hosted Sveriges Radio's winter program in 2009 and 2011; the story of the 2009 program was inspired by his mother's experience with dementia.

In 2006, Rosenfeldt was hired by the Swedish production company Filmlance International to create a crime series that was set in both Sweden and Denmark. The result was The Bridge, a Danish-Swedish co-production that focuses on a pair of detectives investigating a series of crimes that take place near the border of the two countries. The show's first season premiered in 2011 and its second season was aired in 2013. The Bridge was an international success, and spawned five adaptations, including The Bridge, set on the American-Mexican border, and The Tunnel, set on the British-French border.

Rosenfeldt and his friend Michael Hjorth have written a series of crime fiction novels which center around a forensic psychologist. Their first book, Det fördolda (The Secret), was released in 2010, while its sequel, Lärjungen (Disciple), was published in 2011. Together, they adapted the first two novels in the series into a television miniseries, Sebastian Bergman, which was broadcast in 2010.

Rosenfeldt, since 2016, has written the three-series English language detective series Marcella.

Personal life 
Rosenfeldt lives in Täby, Stockholm County, with his wife Lotta. They have three children: Sixten, Alice and Ebba.

References

External links 

1964 births
Living people
People from Borås
Swedish crime fiction writers
Swedish screenwriters
Swedish male screenwriters
20th-century Swedish male actors
Writers from Västergötland
21st-century Swedish writers
21st-century novelists
Swedish male stage actors
Swedish male television actors
Male novelists
21st-century male writers
21st-century screenwriters